Pectinivalva commoni is a moth of the family Nepticulidae. It is found along the south-western coast of Western Australia.

The wingspan is about 5.3 mm for males and 5.3-5.6 mm for females.

The larvae feed on a Eucalyptus species, possibly Eucalyptus delegatensis. They mine the leaves of their host plant. The larval mines were collected in September and adults emerged during the following February.

External links
Australian Faunal Directory
Australian Nepticulidae (Lepidoptera): Redescription of the named species

Moths of Australia
Nepticulidae
Moths described in 1983